Luis Mena Arroyo (April 27, 1920 Churintzio – March 3, 2009) was a Mexican Auxiliary Bishop of the Roman Catholic Archdiocese of Mexico from 1961 to 1964 and, with personal title of Archbishop, from 1979 until 1995. Between those stints, he was coadjutor archbishop in the archdiocese of Chihuahua, 1964–1969, but resigned without succeeding to that see. He remained Archbishop (personal title) and Auxiliary Bishop Emeritus until his death in 2009 in Mexico City.

References

External links 
Catholic Hierarchy:Archbishop Luis Mena Arroyo † 

1920 births
2009 deaths
People from Michoacán
20th-century Roman Catholic bishops in Mexico
20th-century Roman Catholic titular bishops